Between Order and Model is the first release by Welsh post-hardcore band Funeral for a Friend. It was released on 12 August 2002 (see 2002 in music) through Mighty Atom Records in the United Kingdom. It is currently out of print and sought after by collectors. All of the tracks, excluding "Juno", were included on the band's 2003 EP, "Seven Ways to Scream Your Name". "Red Is the New Black" was rerecorded for the band's first album Casually Dressed & Deep in Conversation, whilst "Juno" was rerecorded in a new arrangement and titled "Juneau" for the album. The band recorded a promotional video for "10:45 Amsterdam Conversations" with the current line up in late 2002 for Bandit; a Welsh TV show. The artwork is an old picture of a street in Maesteg, a small town where some of the band members at the time lived (and where Matt and his brother ran a record shop), the view of the mountain these days is now obscured by a school.

The EP was later re-released due to a high demand. The original CD is gold coloured whilst the re-release is pale blue; the liner sleeve on the re-release is a pale blue rather than white and the background colour on the back of the case is also pale blue rather than orange.

A remastered edition was released on November 15, 2013. It included four remastered tracks from the original release, two early versions of later re-recorded songs ("Grand Central Station" became "This Letter"), The Getaway Plan (a song that was released as a B side to the Juneau single as well as on the Seven Ways to Scream Your Name EP) and four live-in-studio versions of the songs.

Track listing

Personnel
Funeral for a Friend
Matthew Evans - unclean vocals
Matt Davies - clean vocals
Kris Roberts (aka Coombs-Roberts) - guitar
Darran Smith (listed as Darren Smith) - guitar
Andi Morris - bass guitar
Johnny Phillips - drums

Additional musicians
Additional backing vocals by Alwyn Davies

Production
Produced and mixed by Joe Gibb and Funeral for a Friend
Engineered by Roger Hopkins and Alwyn Davies
Recorded at Mighty Atom Studios, Swansea

References 

2002 debut EPs
Funeral for a Friend albums